is a role-playing video game developed and published by Level-5 for the Nintendo 3DS and the first game in the Yo-kai Watch franchise. Originally released in Japan on July 11, 2013, the game is based on the Yōkai of Japanese folklore, who are said to be ghosts and apparitions that cause mischief in daily life. In Yo-kai Watch, player character Nathan "Nate" Adams or Katie Forester, depending on who the player chooses, is given the titular watch, which gives him or her the ability to see Yo-kai, after stumbling across and befriending a butler Yo-kai named Whisper. Players assume the role of Nate or Katie, as he or she travels around town searching for and befriending peaceful Yo-kai, battling hostile Yo-kai, and solving problems caused by mischievous Yo-kai.

The game was initially released to a positive commercial and critical reception in Japan, and a steady rise in popularity spawned various media spin-offs, such as a toy line and an anime series, in addition to Yo-kai Watch 2, released the following year for the Nintendo 3DS. Despite the franchise's success in Japan, the game would not be released internationally until two years later, when Nintendo announced plans to localize the game in the West, where it was first released in 2015. By November 2014, the game had sold over a million copies in Japan alone, making it one of the best selling games on the Nintendo 3DS.

Plot

The player can choose whether they want to play as Nathan "Nate" Adams or Katie Forester. The differences are the aesthetics and the home of the characters.

During a bug-collecting assignment assigned to students by a school in suburban Springdale, Nate is jealous of classmate Barnaby "Bear" Berenstein's large stag beetle he caught, and decides to find another bug to rival him. Upon being prompted by the school's janitor to visit Mount Wildwood, Nate discovers an unusual capsule machine. He decides to take a capsule from it, and upon opening the capsule, frees a strange ghostly being. The being introduces himself as Whisper and states that he is what is known as a Yo-kai. He gives Nate the Yo-kai Watch, a device used to find Yo-kai, and prompts Nate to use it. After Nate befriends two additional Yo-kai, Whisper further explains that Yo-kai are as abundant as humans; the only reason Nate could not comprehend them before being that they blend into their surroundings.

Nate returns home with Whisper in tow, only to find that Nate's parents, Lily and Aaron Adams, are bickering over whether Aaron should fix dinner, and find that Dismeralda is the cause. She refuses to leave, but Nate and Whisper head to an intersection and find Jibanyan, who immediately joins them to fight Dismeralda. She is defeated, but her husband, Happiere, calls off the battle and makes up with Dismeralda. He also inspirits Lily and Aaron to allow them to make up, thus ending the conflict.

The following day, Nate visits Katie to find her upset over the fact that she said things she never intended to say to her friend, causing the latter to shut down. Realizing that a Yo-kai is responsible, Nate finds Tattletell, and after befriending her, asks her to inspirit Katie once more to allow her to reconcile with her friend. With the issue resolved, Tattletell reveals why she inspirited Katie in the first place: a group of evil Yo-kai led by Slimamander had broken many seals, thus disrupting the link between the human and Yo-kai realms. With the help of the other Yo-kai thus far, Nate and Whisper defeat all of the evil Yo-kai and roll back the damage caused to the seals.

Realizing how tough Slimamander was, Nate and Whisper decide to head to Timers and More, where the shopkeeper, a human-mimicking Yo-kai named Mr. Goodsight, agrees to upgrade Nate's Yo-kai Watch rank but assigns him two specific tasks to complete beforehand. Nate befriends Baku while completing the first task, who proves the key in commencing out the second task: retrieving Mr. Goodsight's undergarment from the local spa at night. After narrowly evading an Oni attack along the way, they discover that Sproink has stolen the undergarment as a clothing item for himself. A battle ensues, and Nate emerges victorious, thus allowing him to return the undergarments to Mr. Goodsight to complete the watch upgrade.

The next day, after Bear uses his mother's ring to catch the "king of Catfish Pond" and inadvertently loses it, Mr. Bernstein berates his son and instructs him to retrieve it. Nate finds out about the ordeal, and he and Whisper decide to head to a riverside to find a kappa Yo-kai named Walkappa. They head to the lake and find the ring, only to disrupt another Yo-kai named SV Snaggerjag. After the ensuing battle, SV Snaggerjag reveals that he is the king of Catfish Pond, and he warned that the group was scaring off the catfish in the area. The ring is returned to Bear's mother, who reveals that it was not as valuable as was initially believed, relieving Nate, Whisper, Bear, and Walkappa.

The following morning, Aaron Adams, on his way to work, accidentally leaves behind important documents at Sunshine Station thanks to a Yo-kai named Wazzat. Lily Adams is contacted and asks her son to head to the office so that he can return the documents. Nate and Whisper retrieve the documents and board the train with little trouble; however, they are soon ambushed by Wazzat. The two evade Wazzat long enough to return the documents; on the way back, Wazzat reveals that he was lonely and offers to join Nate, of whom the latter accepts.

As thanks for saving his father's job, Nate is given a bike. He rides around Flower Road, only to hear rumors about development in the area. He comes across a Yo-kai named Kyubi, who blackmails him into entering the construction zone at night. Nate and Whisper do so, meeting Komasan, a timid Guardian spirit from the countryside that headed into the city, along the way. However, they find that Kyubi had been leading them to the real culprit all along: a Yo-kai known as Massiface. Nate and his Yo-kai team manage to defeat Massiface after a long battle, and the rumors stop.

Nate then visits Eddie, and the two visit an art museum with Eddie's parents. Though they enjoy the museum, Eddie is distraught that he did not find the exhibit he was looking for. He asks Nate to accompany him in sneaking to the museum at night, which Nate agrees to. After being warped into the museum by a Yo-kai named Mirapo and evading the museum's security protocols, Nate is forced to battle Phantasmurai, a suit of armor that Eddie was trying to observe. Eddie is ridiculed that the suit is controlled by a mouse, but gets over it as he and Nate exit the museum.

All of Nate's friends meet up with him at the school to attempt to find a mysterious Yo-kai that had been causing mischief within the school. The Yo-kai abducts all of Nate's friends, and Nate and Whisper are forced to find them. Finally, they head into the girls' bathroom to find Katie. They find her, but they get blocked by the mischievous Yo-kai, revealed to be Tarantutor. After a long battle, Nate is victorious and joins his friends for a brief fireworks celebration on top of the school.

Whisper, however, becomes suspicious and asks Nate to return to the school to search for more clues. After being directed by Mr. Barton to the abandoned Nocturne Hospital, they find that the building has unusual Yo-kai activity. The source is eventually confirmed to be the evil Doctor Maddiman, of whom Nate is forced to battle. Maddiman is defeated, but not before revealing that he works for Squddilius McKracken, a dissident Yo-kai planning to take over the Yo-kai realm and destroy the human realm.

Nate and Whisper are uneasy but are given hope when a classmate of Nate's, Lucas, reveals that he is a Yo-kai himself, having been born from Enma, the true ruler of the Yo-kai realm. Nate and Whisper venture to the Yo-kai realm to seek answers. They encounter McKracken and seemingly defeat him. However, when they return to the human realm, they find that all of the seals are broken once more, McKracken has deployed his minions in the area, and Slimamander is once again awakened.

Nate and the others manage to defeat all of McKracken's lackeys and restore the seals, but McKracken, refusing to give up, transforms into a giant beast. After a hard battle, Nate and his Yo-kai team defeat McKracken and banish him from the human realm for good. Whisper, knowing that more evil Yo-kai will attack the human realm, decides to close the elevator linking the two realms together; Nate, finally accepting their fate, reluctantly accepts, and all of the Yo-kai forcibly return to their realm, leaving Nate behind. Nate returns to his house as the credits roll, drawing a picture of his Yo-kai friends to remember them.

In a post-credits scene, Nate notices Jibanyan on the edge of his house the following day. To his amazement, all of his Yo-kai friends have restored the elevator, thus able to return to the human realm once more and as Nate puts it 'Everything's back to normal alright!'.

Gameplay

Yo-kai Watch is a role-playing video game where the player searches around Springdale for Yo-kai using the 3DS' touchscreen. Players befriend Yo-kai by giving them a food item that they like before or during battle, and after defeating the Yo-kai it may or may not approach the player character and gives them its Yo-kai Medal, allowing it to be used in the player's team. Yo-kai can also be acquired through an in-game Gasha Machine by collecting in-game coins or using Play Coins. Certain Yo-kai are necessary for completing the game's main quest, and special rare Yo-kai are acquired through various subquests. Yo-kai have the capability to evolve into more powerful versions of themselves if they reach a certain level, or they can evolve by combining with particular items or other Yo-kai. The Yo-kai are divided amongst eight different tribes, each with their own strengths and weaknesses. There are also Legendary Yo-kai that can only be obtained by collecting a particular set of Yo-kai listed in the Yo-kai Medallium, a compendium of the different Yo-kai the player has encountered or befriended.

When the player encounters a Yo-kai, they enter into battle with it using six Yo-kai that the player has befriended previously, and the enemy Yo-kai may bring other Yo-kai to fight with them. The touchscreen is used during battles to rotate amongst the player's Yo-kai in battle at will. It is also used either to clear up status effects on the player's Yo-kai or to charge up the Yo-kai's special abilities. A common in-game event is "Oni Time" (Terror Time), where the player character enters a nightmare realm where he or she looks for treasure chests with special items in them all while trying to avoid being seen by other Yo-kai. If spotted, the player is chased by a powerful Oni Yo-kai that can easily wipe out the player's party unless they can escape. It is possible to defeat the Oni, but only if the player's Yo-kai are particularly powerful. The player can also encounter similarly powerful Namahage Yo-kai if the player crosses the street on a red light, but the encounter may be beneficial if the player follows the rules.

Development
Yo-kai Watch was developed by Level-5, a Japanese video game developer based in Fukuoka, Japan. Before Yo-kai Watch, Level-5 were best known for their Professor Layton series of puzzle adventure games for the Nintendo DS, one of the best selling game series on the platform, with 15 million units sold across six titles. At a time where Level-5 were already successful with resonating with younger gamers with multiple IPs such as Inazuma Eleven and Ni no Kuni, many of the Level-5 staff expressed interest in creating, in Level-5 CEO Akihiro Hino's words, the new Doraemon; a title that would "be loved by many people over a long period of time". The team agreed that such a title would be an open world role-playing game.

Marketing and release
Yo-kai Watch was officially unveiled to the public by Level-5 at the 2011 Tokyo Game Show, where it was announced during the company's annual Level-5 Vision press conference. It was planned from the start that Yo-kai Watch would be a franchise that consisted of a manga and anime series. A shōnen manga series by Noriyuki Konishi began serialization in CoroCoro Comic from December 15, 2012. This series has been licensed by Viz Media under its Perfect Square imprint. The series went on to earn awards for best Children's Manga at the 2014 Kodansha Manga Awards and at the 2015 Shogakukan Manga Awards. Prior to the release of Yo-kai Watch in Japan, a game demo was made available to download from the Nintendo eShop on July 3, 2013.

After the success of the game and its sequel, Yo-kai Watch 2, a localization of the franchise in territories outside Japan was seriously considered. After registering a trademark for the Yo-kai Watch brand in the United States in January 2014, and inviting public opinion on an international release of the game, Level-5 formally announced in April 2015 that the game would indeed be released in the United States, Europe, Australia, New Zealand, Latin America, and Korea, with Nintendo helping to publish the game outside Japan. At E3 2015, a trailer for the game was showcased during Nintendo's Digital Event presentation, and demos of the game were available to play on the show floor during the convention. A release window of Holiday 2015 was also announced at the convention, with the date being further clarified to a November 6 release in North America by the time the game was showcased at the EB Games Expo 2015. A demo for the game was released on the Nintendo eShop in North America on October 22, 2015. The game was also sold as a bundle with the Nintendo 2DS in North America, selling under $100.

An anime series based on the video game premiered on the TX Network, owned by TV Tokyo, on January 8, 2014, six months after the Japanese release of the game. The series has run continuously on TV Tokyo since then, including a rebranding as a "Second Season" featuring new characters from the upcoming Yo-kai Watch 3 game. As part of efforts to localize Yo-kai Watch in western countries, the series was broadcast in the United States; dubbed in English and premiered on Disney XD on October 5, 2015, a month before the release of the game in North America. The series was broadcast in Australia on GO! in 2016.

In July 2019, Level-5 announced the first game in the series would be ported to the Nintendo Switch; the port was released on October 10, 2019, in Japan. Unlike the original 3DS version, there was no option to use English text. The game was ported to mobile devices via iOS and Android in Japan on July 10, 2021.

Reception

Japanese video game magazine Famitsu scored the game a 36 out of 40, with all of the four judges of the review giving the game 9 out of 10. Editor Reona Ebihara wrote that "the game gradually expands its feature set as you go, opening up this very unique world that's easy to melt into." She also commented positively of the game's use of the Nintendo 3DS' stereoscopic features and its "simple and deeply strategic" battle system. Fellow reviewer Urara Honma corroborated Ebihara's remarks, stating that the battle system felt "really great to control". She further wrote, "You won't run into much frustration playing this game, and while it does feel like one big fetch quest at times, the charms of the story more than make up for that." IGN awarded it a score of 7.2 out of 10, saying "Yo-kai Watchs gameplay is inconsistent, but its world is compelling."

Sales

Yo-kai Watch debuted with a strong opening week, selling over 53,000 units in its first week of availability; the best selling handheld game in Japan and second-best selling game in Japan for that week, beaten only by Nintendo's 92,000 unit sales for Pikmin 3. In a list published at the end of the year, Japanese video game magazine Famitsu named Yo-kai Watch as the 23rd best selling game in Japan, with just over 280,000 units sold. After the debut of the Yo-kai Watch anime in January 2014, Level-5, a month later, reported that the sales numbers for the game had spiked to over 500,000 physical copies of the game sold alone, without including digital download sales. The number was brought up to over 800,000, including digital sales, after sales tracker Media Create reported the game had sold as much by May 2015, though, Famitsu reported a more conservative estimate of 650,000 in the same time frame. The month earlier, however, Level-5 reported that they had, in fact, shipped 1 million units, with Level-5 CEO Akihiro Hino stating, in an interview with Famitsu, that he believed that the game would reach the million sales mark soon. By June, a month before the release of the game's sequel, Yo-kai Watch 2, the game had crossed the million sales milestone, according to Media Create, after a steady increase of weekly sales since January 2014. By November 2014, the game had sold a total of just under 1,294,000 units sold in Japan. As of June 10, 2016, the game sold 400,000 units in North America. Although that number was below Level-5's expectations, it still got the Yo-kai Watch franchise off to a promising start overseas, and instilled confidence that the franchise would find its place.

The Nintendo Switch port sold 9,426 copies in its first week on sale, placing 4th overall for software sales.

Sequels

Borrowing near-identical gameplay elements from the original Yo-kai Watch, the games featured an expanded setting, a brand-new story, additional game modes, and a broadly expanded roster of Yo-kai. The games were released to positive critical reception, and an overwhelmingly successful commercial performance was boosted by the popularity of the anime and the preceding game. Both versions of the game accumulated pre-order sales of over 800,000, with the games selling over 1.28 million units in their first week of sale. The games would go on to become the best selling games in Japan for 2014, selling over 3 million copies by December and outperforming Nintendo's Pokémon franchise with Pokémon Omega Ruby and Alpha Sapphire and Capcom's Monster Hunter franchise, with Monster Hunter 4 Ultimate. The games join Yo-kai Watch as two of the best selling games on the Nintendo 3DS. A third version of the game, was released in December 2014, adding enhancements to the original Ganso and Honke versions of the game.

Because of the healthy sales of the first game and the first set of sequels, additional sequels titled Yo-kai Watch 3 and Yo-kai Watch 4 were released initially in Japan in July 2016 and June 2019, respectively.

References

External links
 
 

2013 video games
Level-5 (company) games
Nintendo 3DS eShop games
Nintendo 3DS games
Nintendo Network games
Nintendo Switch games
Open-world video games
Role-playing video games
Video games featuring protagonists of selectable gender
Video games developed in Japan
Video games set in Japan
Yo-kai Watch video games
Japan Game Awards' Game of the Year winners
Multiplayer and single-player video games